John Maffey may refer to:

 John Maffey, 1st Baron Rugby (1877–1969), British civil servant and diplomat
John Maffey (MP) (fl.1414)